Arto Sutinen (born 10 March 1954) is a Finnish biathlete. He competed in the 10 km sprint event at the 1980 Winter Olympics.

References

External links
 

1954 births
Living people
Finnish male biathletes
Olympic biathletes of Finland
Biathletes at the 1980 Winter Olympics
People from Suonenjoki
Sportspeople from North Savo